Lalevade-d'Ardèche is a commune in the Ardèche department in southern France.

It is the commune with the smallest area in the department.

Economy
In the 19th century, the commune was an active industrial center, with coal mines and tanneries. Today, the economy is dominated by tourism.

Population
The population has remained relatively stable since 1900, with slight fluctuations.

See also
Communes of the Ardèche department

References

Communes of Ardèche
Ardèche communes articles needing translation from French Wikipedia